Thinking of You is a studio album by Bogdan Raczynski. It was released on Rephlex Records in 1999.

Track listing

References

External links
 
 Thinking of You at Rephlex Records

1999 albums
Bogdan Raczynski albums
Rephlex Records albums